The 117th Regiment Indiana Infantry was an infantry regiment from Indiana that served in the Union Army during the American Civil War. The regiment was mustered into Federal service in September 1863 to serve for six months. It served in the Knoxville campaign in East Tennessee, fighting in actions at Blue Springs and Bean's Station in 1863. The regiment was mustered out at the end of February 1864 having lost no men in action and 95 men dead from disease.

History
Organized at Indianapolis, Indiana, and mustered in for 6 months' service September 17, 1863. Left State for Nicholasville, Kentucky, September 17. Attached to John R. Mahan's 1st Brigade, Wilcox's Left Wing Forces, Dept. of the Ohio, to December, 1863. 1st Brigade, 3rd Division, 23rd Army Corps, to January, 1864. District of the Clinch, Dept. of the Ohio, to February, 1864.

March from Nicholasville to Cumberland Gap on September 24–October 3, 1863; thence to Morristown, Tennessee, on October 6–8. Battle of Blue Springs on October 10. March to Greenville and duty there until November 6. Moved to Bean's Station on November 6. Battle of Bean's Station (also known as Action at Clinch Mountain Gap) on November 14. Duty at Tazewell, Maynardville, and Cumberland Gap until February 1864. Action at Tazewell January 24, 1864. Mustered out February 23–27, 1864.

Regiment lost during service 95 enlisted men by disease. Total 95.

See also

 List of Indiana Civil War regiments
 Indiana in the Civil War

References

Attribution
 

Military units and formations established in 1863
Military units and formations disestablished in 1864
1864 disestablishments in the United States
Units and formations of the Union Army from Indiana
1863 establishments in Indiana